This is a discography of the Dutch DJ, record producer and remixer Ferry Corsten (also known under the alias System F).

Studio albums

As DJ Sno-White
 1996: Santa's X-Mas Dance Party
As Ferr
 1996: Looking Forward
 2020: As Above So Below
As System F
 2001: Out of the Blue
 2003: Together

Extended plays 
 2015: Hello World 1
 2015: Hello World 2
 2015: Hello World 3
 2016: From the Heavens EP (as Ferry Corsten presents Gouryella)

Remix albums
 2009: Twice in a Blue Moon Remixed
 2017: Blueprint Remixed

Compilation albums
2000: Early Works & Remix Projects
2002: The Very Best of Ferry Corsten
2004: Best (as System F, Gouryella)
2005: Best of System F & Gouryella (Part One)
2006: Best of System F & Gouryella (Part Two)
2009: The Best of Pulp Victim (only digital download)
2014: Trance Classics - The Best Of (as Pulp Victim) (only digital download)
2016: From the Heavens (as Ferry Corsten presents Gouryella) (only digital download) (the dj mix is also in cd)

DJ mixes

1999 Artist Profile Series 1: Solar Serenades
1999 Live at Innercity: Amsterdam RAI
1999 Trance Nation
1999 Trance Nation 2
2000 TranceMatch (as System F vs. Armin)
2000 Trance Nation Three
2000 Trance Nation Four
2000 Judge Jules Presents Judgement Sundays
2000 Oslo Central
2001 Tsunami One (as Ferry Corsten & Robert Smit)
2001 Trance Nation 2001
2001 Global Trancemissions 01: Amsterdam
2001 Trancedome 1
2001 Live at Dance Valley
2002 Trance Nation 2002
2002 Global Trancemissions 02: Ibiza
2002 World Tour: Tokyo
2003 Kontor Top of the Clubs Vol. 18
2003 Mixed Live: Spundae @ Circus, Los Angeles
2003 World Tour: Washington

2004 Dance Valley #10: A Decade of Dance: Main Stage Edition
2004 Infinite Euphoria
2005 Passport: Kingdom of the Netherlands
2005 Creamfields 2005
2006 Mixmag 03/06
2007 Passport: United States of America
2007 Live at Dance Valley 2007
2008 Gatecrasher Sheffield
2010 Once Upon a Night Vol. 1
2010 Once Upon a Night (Special Summer Mix) 
2010 Once Upon a Night Vol. 2
2012 20 Years of Ferry Corsten: The Mix
2012 The Sound of Flashover
2012 Once Upon a Night Vol. 3
2013 Once Upon a Night Vol. 4
2013 Full On Ibiza
2016 From the Heavens (as Ferry Corsten presents Gouryella)

Soundtrack albums
2019 Don't Go (Original Motion Picture Soundtrack)

Singles

Ferry Corsten:
2002 "Punk" - #29 UK
2003 "Indigo"
2003 "Rock Your Body Rock" - #11 UK (2004 release), #72 AUS
2004 "Believe the Punk" (vs. Lange)
2004 "Everything Goes"
2004 "It's Time" - #51 UK
2004 "Right of Way"
2004 "Sweet Sorrow"
2004 "Kyoto"
2005 "Holding On"
2005 "Star Traveller"
2005 "Sublime"
2006 "Fire" - #40 UK, #61 AUS
2006 "Junk" - #38 NL
2006 "Watch Out" - #57 UK
2006 "Whatever!"
2007 "Beautiful"
2007 "Forever"
2007 "The Race"
2007 "Brain Box"
2007 "Bring the Noise Remix" (as Public Enemy vs. Ferry Corsten)
2008 "Into the Dark"
2008 "Radio Crash"
2009 "Made of Love" (featuring Betsie Larkin)
2009 "We Belong" (featuring Maria Nayler)
2009 "Because the Remix" (featuring Novastar)
2011 "Feel It!"
2011 "Check It Out"
2011 "Brute" (vs. Armin van Buuren)
2012 "Ain't No Stoppin'" (featuring Ben Hague)
2012 "Live Forever" (featuring Aruna)
2012 "Loops & Tings" (vs. Markus Schulz)
2012 "Not Coming Down" (featuring Betsie Larkin)
2012 "Silfra"
2012 "Stella" (vs. Markus Schulz)
2013 "One Thousand Suns" (instrumental version featuring Chicane) 
2013 "Kudawudashuda"
2013 "Love Will" (featuring Duane Harden)
2013 "Stars"  (as Betsie Larkin & Ferry Corsten)
2013 "One Thousand Suns" (vocal version featuring Chicane and Christian Burns)
2013 "Collision" (& Bassjackers)
2013 "Black Light"
2013 "F the Bull$h1t"
2013 "Magenta" (with Giuseppe Ottaviani)
2013 "Love Will" (with Duane Harden)
2013 "Diss!"
2013 "Many Ways"
2014 "Hyper Love" (featuring Nat Dunn)
2015 "Back to Paradise" (featuring Haris)
2015 "Hearts Beating Faster" (featuring Ethan Thompson)
2016 "Event Horizon" (with Cosmic Gate)
2017 "Dynamic" (with Cosmic Gate)
2017 "Reanimate" (featuring Clairity)
2017 "Waiting" (featuring Niels Geusebroek)
2017 "Trust"
2017 "Wherever You Are" (featuring Haliene)
2017 "Lonely Inside"
2018 "Something To Believe In" (featuring Eric Lumiere)
2018 "Camellia" (with Aly & Fila)
2018 "A Slice of Heaven" (with Paul Oakenfold) (UNITY project)
2018 "Safe With Me" (with Dim3nsion)(UNITY project)
2018 "Rosetta" (with Jordan Suckley)(UNITY project)
2018 "I Love You (Won't Give It Up)"
2018 "Synchronicity" (with Saad Ayub)(UNITY project)
2018 "We're Not Going Home" (with Ilan Bluestone)(UNITY project)
2019 "Freefall" (featuring Nevve)
2019 "1997" (with BT)(UNITY project)
2019 "Hear It Now" (with Johnny B)
2019 "I Am You" (with Gabriel & Dresden)(UNITY project)
2020 "Flanging" (with Purple Haze)(UNITY project)
2020 "Tomorrow"
2020 "Mo Chara" (with Ciaran McAuley)(UNITY project)
2020 "Black Lion" (with Trance Wax)(UNITY project)
2020 "Our Moon" (featuring Lovlee)
2020 "Free" (with Trance Unity)(UNITY project)
2021 "Bloodstream" (with Ruben de Ronde)
2021 "Glow" (with Tom Staar featuring Darla Jade)
2021 "Trust You" (with Leon Bolier featuring Nblm)
2021 "Lemme Take You"
2021 "Poison" (featuring Lovlee)
2021 "For Your Mind"
2022 "Wounded" (with Morgan Page featuring Cara Melín)

Aliases 

4x4:
2004 "Midsummer Rain" (as 4x4)

A Jolly Good Fellow:
1995 "Dancing Sparks" (as A Jolly Good Fellow)
1996 "Keep It Going" (as A Jolly Good Fellow)
1996 "Killer Beats" (as A Jolly Good Fellow)
1996 "My Bass" (as A Jolly Good Fellow)

Albion:
1997 "Reach for the Sky" (as Albion)
1998 "Air" (as Albion)
2000 "Air 2000" (as Albion) - #59 UK

Bypass:
1996 "Cyberia" (as Bypass)
1997 "Cry for Your Love" (as Bypass)

Cyber F:
2005 "The Midnight Sun" (as Cyber F)

Digital Control:
2000 "Dreams Last for Long" (as Digital Control)

East West:
2004 "The Love I Lost" (as East West)

Eon:
2002 "Pocket Damage" (as Eon)
2002 "Talk to Me" (as Eon)

Exiter:
1995 "Doodlebug" (as Exiter)
1995 "Eyes in the Sky" (as Exiter)
1995 "Trezpazz" (as Exiter)
1997 "Iquana" (as Exiter)
1997 "Salamander" (as Exiter)
1997 "The Lizard" (as Exiter)

Ferr:
1996 "Legend" (as Ferr)
1996 "Midnight Moods" (as Ferr)
1996 "NightTime Experience" (as Ferr)
1997 "Dreamscape" (as Ferr)
1997 "Stardust" (as Ferr)
1997 "Transition" (as Ferr)
2021 "Hands" (as Ferr) [with Youth Novels]

Firmly Underground:
1997 "Hide & Seek" (as Firmly Underground)
1997 "Mozaiks" (as Firmly Underground)

Free Inside
1994 "Skip Da Dipp" (as Free Inside)
1994 "Underground" (as Free Inside)
1995 "Never Felt (This Way)" (as Free Inside)

Funk Einsatz:
2001 "My Dance" (as Funk Einsatz)

Gouryella:
1998 "Gouryella" (as Gouryella) - #15 UK
1999 "Walhalla" (as Gouryella) - #27 UK
1999 "In Walhalla" (as Gouryella)
1999 "Gorella"  (as Gouryella)
2000 "Tenshi" (as Gouryella) - #45 UK
2002 "Ligaya" (as Gouryella, Tiësto did not participate)
2015 "Anahera" (as Gouryella)
2016 "Neba" (as Gouryella)
2017 "Venera (Vee's Theme)" (as Gouryella)

Kinky Toys:
1997 "Carpe Diem" (as Kinky Toys)
1997 "Dissimilation" (as Kinky Toys)
1997 "Hit 'M Hard" (as Kinky Toys)
1997 "Somewhere Out There (Aliens Are Lurking)" (as Kinky Toys)

Lunalife:
1996 "Lunalife" (as Lunalife)
1996 "Supernatural" (as Lunalife)

Moonman:
1996 "Don't Be Afraid" (as Moonman) - #60 UK
1996 "Galaxia" (as Moonman) - #50 UK (2000 release)
1996 "Marsfire" (as Moonman)
1997 "First Light" (as Moonman)
1999 "Don't Be Afraid '99" (as Moonman) - #41 UK

Party Cruiser:
1996 "This Record Is Being Played in Clubs, Discolounges, House- Basement- or Blockparties" (as Party Cruiser)

Pulp Victim:
1997 "Another World" (as Pulp Victim)
1997 "Dreams Last for Long" (as Pulp Victim)
1997 "I'm Losing Control" (as Pulp Victim)
1997 "Mind Over Matter" (as Pulp Victim)
1997 "The World" (as Pulp Victim)
1998 "Freak Waves" (as Pulp Victim)

Pulse:
2010 "Rendition" (as Ferry Corsten presents Pulse)

Raya Shaku:
1996 "The Rising Sun" (as Raya Shaku)

Sidewinder:
1998 "Hit the Honeypot" (as Sidewinder)
1998 "Mindsensations" (as Sidewinder)

Skywalker:
1996 "Intentions" (as Skywalker)
1996 "Macarony" (as Skywalker)
1996 "Seed" (as Skywalker)

System F:
1999 "Out of the Blue" (as System F) - #14 UK
2000 "Cry" (as System F) - #19 UK
2000 "Unplugged, Mixed & Motion" (as System F)
2001 "Dance Valley Theme 2001" (as System F)
2001 "Exhale" (as System F featuring Armin van Buuren)
2001 "Soul On Soul" (as System F featuring Marc Almond)
2002 "Needle Juice" (as System F)
2002 "Solstice" (as System F)
2003 "Out of the Blue" (2nd 2003 edition as System F)
2003 "Spaceman" (as System F)
2004 "Ignition, Sequence, Start!" (as System F)
2005 "Pegasus" (as System F)
2005 "Reaching Your Soul" (as System F)
2011 "The Blue Theme" (as System F vs. Cosmic Gate)

The Nutter:
1996 "Gimme Your Love" (as The Nutter)
1996 "Locked On Target" (as The Nutter)
1996 "Mindfuck" (as The Nutter)

Zenithal:
1992 "Sssshhhht EP" (as Zenithal)
1996 "Alasca" (as Zenithal)

Groups 

Alter Native:
1995 "Joy Factory" (as Alter Native)
1996 "I Feel Good" (as Alter Native)
1997 "The Warning" (as Alter Native)

Blade Racer:
1996 "Master Blaster Party" (as Blade Racer)

Discodroids:
1996 "The Show" (as Discodroids)
1997 "Interspace" (as Discodroids)
1998 "Energy" (as Discodroids)

Double Dutch:
1998 "Here We Go...!" (as Double Dutch)

Elektrika:
1998 "It Makes Me Move" (as Elektrika)
1998 "Whisper" (as Elektrika)

Energiya:
1997 "Straight Kickin'" (as Energiya)
1997 "Tomba Dance" (as Energiya)

FB:
2005 "Who's Knockin'?" (as FB)

Fernick:
1996 "What Would You Like Me to Do" (as Fernick)
1998 "Haus" (as Fernick)

Mind To Mind:
1992 "Zen" (as Mind to Mind)
1997 "Music Is My Life" (as Mind to Mind)

New World Punx:
2013 "Romper" (with Markus Schulz together as New World Punx)

Nixieland:
1998 "All I Need, All I Want" (as Nixieland)

Penetrator:
1997 "Love Entry" (as Penetrator)

Project Aurora:
1999 "Sinners" (as Project Aurora)

Riptide:
1996 "Docking" (as Riptide)
1996 "Moony" (as Riptide)
1997 "Click" (as Riptide)
1997 "Dope" (as Riptide)
1997 "Going Back" (as Riptide)
1999 "Got2Get2Gether" (as Riptide)

Roef:
1997 "Outthere" (as Roef)

S.O.A:
1993 "Schollevaar Feelings" (as S.O.A)

Scum:
1994 "Your Gun'" (as Scum)

Selected Worx:
1998 "Volume 1" (as Selected Worx)

Sons of Aliens:
1994 "Intruders EP" (as Sons of Aliens)
1994 "Welcome to Dew. Lokh" (as Sons of Aliens)
1995 "In Love EP" (as Sons of Aliens)

Soundcheck:
1999 "Minddrive" (as Soundcheck)

Spirit of Adventure:
1991 "Spirit of Adventure" (as Spirit of Adventure)

Starparty:
1997 "I'm in Love" (as Starparty) - #26 UK

The Tellurians:
1992 "Illustrator E.P." (as The Tellurians)
1996 "The Navigator" (as The Tellurians)
1996 "Nightflight" (as The Tellurians)
1998 "Space Is the Place" (as The Tellurians)
1999 "Danca Alderbaran" (as The Tellurians)

Veracocha:
1999 "Drafting" (as Veracocha)
1999 "Carte Blanche" (as Veracocha) - #22 UK

Vimana:
1999 "We Came" (as Vimana)
1999 "Dreamtime" (as Vimana)

Remixes

#
2 Brothers on the 4th Floor - "Do You Know?" (Dance Therapy Remix)
2 Brothers on the 4th Floor - "I'm Thinkin' of U" (Dance Therapy Remix)
2 Brothers on the 4th Floor - "The Sun Will Be Shining" (Dance Threrapy Remix)
2 Brothers on the 4th Floor - "There's a Key" (Dance Threrapy Remix)
2 Brothers on the 4th Floor - "Where You're Going To?" (Dance Therapy Remix)
A
Albion - "Air 2000" (Ferry Corsten's Open Air Remix)
Alexis Jordan - "Acid Rain" (Ferry Corsten Remix)
Alter Native - "I Feel Good" (A Jolly Good Remix)
Ami Suzuki - "Around the World" (Ferry Corsten Remix)
Ami Suzuki - "Fantastic" (Ferry Corsten Remix)
Analogue Sound Department - "Greetings" (Ferry Corsten Edit)
Apoptygma Berzerk - "Kathy's Song" (Come Lie Next To Me) (Ferry Corsten Remix)
Arkadia - "Now" (Moonman Remix)
Armand van Helden - "Witch Doktor" (Free Inside Remix)
Armin van Buuren featuring Cathy Burton - "Rain" (FERR By Ferry Corsten Rework)
Art of Trance - "Madagascar" (Ferry Corsten Remix)
Atlantic Ocean - "The Cycle of Life" (Discodroids Remix)
Aven - "All I Wanna Do" (Ferry Corsten Remix)
Ayla - "Ayla" (Veracocha Remix)
Ayumi Hamasaki - "A Song for XX" (Ferry Corsten Chilled Mix)
Ayumi Hamasaki - "Connected" (Ferry Corsten Remix)
Ayumi Hamasaki - "Kanariya" (System F remix)
Ayumi Hamasaki - "Whatever" (System F Remix)
Azzido Da Bass - "Dooms Night" (Timo Maas Remix) (Ferry Corsten Edit)
B
Ballyhoo featuring Xandra - "Feelin' Good" (Cada Club Mix)
BBE - "Seven Days and One Week" (Ferry Corsten Remix)
Béatrice Marquez - "All I Wanna Do" (Ferry Corsten Remix)
Betsie Larkin & Ferry Corsten - "Stars" (Ferry Fix) 
Binary Finary - "1999" (Gouryella Remix)
Bizarre Supreme - "My Mind" (Free Inside Remix) 
Blackwater - "Deep Down" (Dance Therapy Mix)
Blank & Jones - "Flying to the Moon" (Moonman Remix)
Bobina - "Invisible Touch" (Ferry Corsten's Touch)
Bose - "Eso No" (Ferry Corsten Remix)
BT featuring JC Chasez - "The Force of Gravity" (Ferry Corsten Bootleg Remake)
BT - "Suddenly" (Ferry Corsten Remix)
C
Cascade - "Transcend (Moonman's Trancedental Flight Remix)
Ceremony X featuring Enrico - "Planet of Dreams (Keep It Live)" (Kinky Toys Remix)
Chestnut - "Pot of Gold" (Ferry Corsten Remix)
Chiara - "Guardian Angel" (Dance Therapy Remix)
Chiara - "Nowhere to Run" (Moonman Remix)
Clasher - "Gonna Set You Free" (Roef Remix) 
Corderoy - "Sweetest Dreams" (Ferry Corsten Remix)
Coco & Stonebridge - "The Beach" (Riptide's Absolute Pressure Mix)
Cosmic Gate - "The Truth" (Ferry Corsten Remix)
Crooklyn Clan vs. DJ Kool - "Here We Go Now" (Dance Therapy Remix)
Cygnus X - "The Orange Theme" (Moonman's Orange Juice Mix)
D
Dash Berlin - "When You Were Around" (Ferry Corsten Fix)
De Bos - "Chase" (Pulp Victim's Chase Remix)
De Bos - "On the Run" (Pulp Victim Remix)
Desiderio - "Starlight" (Ferry Corsten Remix)
Digital Control - "Dreams Last for Long" (Ferry Corsten and Night & Day Remix)
Digital Control - "Dreams Last for Long" (Pulp Victim Extended Remix)
Digital Control - "Dreams Last for Long" (Vincent de Moor and Pulp Victim Remix)
Dim3nsion and Rama Duke - "Racing Against Time" (Ferry Corsten Edit)
Discodroids - "Energy" (Moonman Remix)
DJ Philip - "Heaven" (Moonman Remix)
Dreamon - "The Beat" (A Jolly Good Remix)
Duran Duran - "(Reach Up For the) Sunrise" (Ferry Corsten Dub Mix)
E
E.F.O. - "Now" (Moonman's Flashover Mix)
Electrique Boutique - "Revelation" (Ferry Corsten Remix)
Elles de Graaf - "Show You My World" (Ferry Corsten Remix)
Embrace - "Embrace" (Ferry Fix) 
Every Little Thing - "For the Moment" (Ferry Corsten Remix)
E'voke - "Arms of Loren" (Ferry Corsten Remix)
F
F Massif - "Somebody" (Ferry Corsten Remix)
F-Action - "Thanks to You" (Ferry Corsten Remix)
Faithless featuring Boy George - "Why Go" (Ferry Corsten Remix)
Faithless featuring Dido - "Feelin Good" (Ferry Corsten Fix)
FB - "Who's Knockin'" (featuring Edun) (Ferry Corsten Remix)
Fearless - "Inca" (Ferry Corsten Remix)
Ferry Corsten - "It's Time" (Ferry Corsten's Flashover Remix)
Ferry Corsten - "Rock Your Body, Rock" (Ferry Corsten Remix)
Ferry Corsten - "Sweet Sorrow" (Ferry Corsten Fix)
Ferry Corsten and Johnny B - "Hear It Now" (Ferry Corsten Fix)
Ferry Corsten featuring Guru - "Junk" (Ferry Corsten's Flashover Remix)
Ferry Corsten featuring Howard Jones - "Into the Dark" (Ferry Fix)
Ferry Corsten featuring Lovlee - Poison (Breaks Mix)
Ferry Corsten featuring Shelley Harland - "Holding On" (Ferry Corsten's Flashover Remix)
Ferry Corsten featuring Simon Le Bon - "Fire" (Ferry Corsten's Flashover Remix)
Fischerspooner - "Never Win" (Benny Benassi Remix) (Ferry Corsten Recut)
Formologic - "My X-Perience" (Moonman Remix)
Freakyman - "Discobug '97 (Got The Feelin' Now)" (Dance Therapy Remix)
Future Breeze - "How Much Can You Take?" (Moonman's Flashover Mix) 
Future Breeze - "Smile" (Ferry Corsten Remix)
G
Girl Next Door - "Jounetsu no Daishou" (Ferry Corsten Remix)
Glow featuring Linda - "Let Me Fly" (Moonman Remix)
Gouryella - "Ligaya" (Ferry Corsten Remix)
Gouryella - "Walhalla" (System F 'In Walhalla' Remix)
H
Haliene - "Dream in Color" (Ferry Corsten Remix)
Hole In One - "Amhran in 7th Phase" (Ferr's Subliminal Remix)
Hole In One - "Ride the Moon" (Starcruise Remix)
Hole In One - "Yoga Session" (The Tellurians Mix)
Hole In One - "(Lets') Ride the Moo"n (Ferry Corsten's Starcrusise Fix NEW [11.01 Mins])
I
Imogen Heap - "Hide and Seek" (Ferry Corsten Bootleg Remix)
J
Justin Bieber featuring Big Sean - "As Long As You Love Me" (Ferry Corsten Remix)

K
Kai Tracid - "Conscious" (Ferry Corsten Remix)
Kamaya Painters - "Endless Wave" (Albion Remix)
Klubbheads - "Klubbhopping" (A Jolly Good Remix)
Kosheen - "Catch" (Ferry Corsten Remix)
L
Laidback Luke featuring Jonathan Mendelsohn - "Till Tonight" (Ferry Corsten Fix) 
Libra Presents Taylor - "Anomaly (Calling Your Name)" (Ferry Corsten Remix)/(Albion Remix) 
Lighthouse Family - "Happy" (Ferry Corsten Remix)
Liquid Child - "Return of Atlantis" (Ferry Corsten Remix)
Love Child - "Liberta" (Moonman Remix)
Luis Paris - "Incantation" (Ferry Corsten & Robert Smit Remix)
M
Manufactured Superstars featuring Scarlett Quinn - "Take Me Over" (Ferry Corsten Fix)
Marc Et Claude - "I Need Your Lovin'" (Ferry Corsten Remix)
Marc Et Claude - "La" (Moonman's Flashover Mix)
Marc Et Claude - "Ne" (Moonman's Flashover Mix)
Marco Borsato - "De Bestemming" (Ferry Corsten Remix)
Matt Darey - "Liberation (Fly Like an Angel)" (Feat. Marcella Woods) (Ferry Corsten Remix)
Mind One - "Hurt of Intention" (Ferry Fix)
Moby - "After" (Ferry Corsten Fix)
Moby - "In My Heart" (Ferry Corsten Remix)
Moby - "Why Does My Heart Feel So Bad" (Ferry Corsten Remix)
Moonman - "Don't Be Afraid" (Ferr Remix) 
Moonman - "Don't Be Afraid" (Moonman Remix)
Moonman - "Don't Be Afraid" (System F'99 Remix)
Mother's Pride - "Learning to Fly" (Moonman Remix)
Movin' Melodies - "Fiesta Conga '98" (Dance Therapy Remix)
Mr. S. Oliver - "Funkin' Down the Track" (The Best DJ) (Moonman Remix)
N
Nance - "Kiss It!" (Dance Therapy Remix)
Nelly Furtado - "Do It" (Ferry Corsten Remix)
Nick K - "Fluctuation" (Ferry Corsten Remix)
O
Oceanlab featuring Justine Suissa - "Clear Blue Water" (Ferry Corsten Remix)
P
Paradiso - "Shine" (Dance Therapy Club Mix)
Peplab - "Welcome to the Bear" (Ferry Corsten Remix)
PF Project featuring Ewan McGregor - "Choose Life" (Ferry Corsten Remix)
Pirate featuring Bob Dylan - "Leaving the Sun" (Ferry Corsten Remix)
Pulp Victim - "The World '99" (Moonman Remix)
Purple Stories - "Path to Nowhere" (Ferry Corsten Edit)
Push - "Universal Nation 1999" (Ferry Corsten Remix)
R
R.O.O.S. - "Body, Mind & Spirit" (Dance Therapy Club Remix)
R.O.O.S. - "Instant Moments (Waiting For)" (Dance Therapy Club Remix)
Rachel - "Is It Wrong Is It Right?" (Ferry Corsten Remix)
Rafaël Frost - "Red" (Ferry Corsten Remix)
Rainy City Music - "Deep Space (The Discovery)" (The Tellurians Remix)
Ramin Djawadi - "Prison Break Theme" (Ferry Corsten Breakout Mix)
Rank 1 - "Awakening" (Ferry Corsten Remix)
Ransom - "My Dance" (Ferry Corsten Remix)
Raya Shaku - "The Rising Sun" (Ferr Remix)
Roger Goode - "In the Beginning Again" (Ferry Corsten Remix)
Ronald Clark - "Speak to Me" (Rainy City's Tellurian Revamp Mix)
S
Selected Worx - "Downforce" (Sidewinder Mix) 
Sex U All - "Nasty Girl" (Nasty Groove Mix)
Shiny Toy Guns - "Le Disko" (Ferry Corsten Mix)
Sidney Samson - "Blasted" (Ferry Corsten Remix) 
Snow Patrol - "New York" (Ferry Corsten Remix)
Solange - "Messages" (Gouryella Remix)
Solarstone & Alucard - "Late Summer Fields" (Ferry Corsten Remix)
Starparty - "I'm In Love" (Ferry Corsten Remix)
Starparty - "I'm In Love" (Ferry Corsten & Robert Smit Remix)
Stonebridge - "Freak On" featuring Ultra Nate (Ferry Corsten Remix)
Subsola - "So Pure" (Ferry Corsten Remix)
Sundance - "Sundance" (Moonman Remix)
System F - "Cry" (DotNL Mix)
System F - "Cry" (Ferry Corsten Club Remix)
System F - "Insolation" (Ferry Corsten's Flashover Remix)
System F - "Out of the Blue" (System F's 5AM Remix)
System F vs. Cosmic Gate - "The Blue Theme" (Ferry Corsten Fix)
T
Techno Matic - "It's Time to Party" (Spirit Of Adventure Remix)
Telex - "Radio Radio" (The Tellurians Mix)
The Gatekeepers - "Widdeldiduu" (Roef Mix)
The Generator - "Where Are You Now" (Moonman Remix)
The Killers - "Human" (Ferry Corsten Club Mix)
The Space Brothers - "Forgiven (I Feel Your Love)" (Pulp Victim Remix)
The Space Brothers - "This Is Love" (Ferry Corsten Mix) 
The Tellurians - "Space Is the Space" (Barbarella Strikes Back Mix)
The Tellurians - "Space Is the Space" (Deep Space Is the Place Mix)
The Thrillseekers - "Synaesthesia 2004" (Ferry Corsten Remix)
The Timeless Love on Orchestra - "I Feel Love" (The Tellurians House Mix)
Tiësto featuring Jónsi - "Kaleidoscope" (Ferry Corsten Remix)
Tony Walker - "Field of Joy" (Ferry Corsten Remix)
Topcat - "Chicago" (Pulp Victim Remake) 
Trance Induction - "ET Welcome Song '99" (Ferry Corsten Remix)
Two Phunky People - "DJ Killa!" (Moonman Remix)
U
U2 - "New Year's Day" (Ferry Corsten Remix)
V
Vanessa Aman - "Wishin' On a Star" (Drum N' Bass Therapy Mix)
Vincent de Moor - "Orion City" (Moonman's Drift Remix)
W
Waldo - "The Look" (Cada's Jungle Mix)
We Are Loud featuring Katie DiCicco - "On the Run" (Ferry Corsten Remix)
William Orbit - "Barber's Adagio for Strings" (Ferry Corsten Remix)
William Orbit - "Clavier" (Ferry Corsten Remix) 
William Orbit - "Ravel's Pavane Pour Une Infante Defunte" (Ferry Corsten Remix)
Y
Yoji Biomehanika - "Theme from Bangin' Globe" (System F Remix)
Yosh presents @-Large - "Groundshaker" (Discodroids Remix)

This is not a complete list of remixes.

Aliases
This list contains the names of the known aliases used by Ferry Corsten.

4x4
A Jolly Good Fellow
Albion
Bypass
Cyber F
Dance Therapy
Delaquente
DJ Sno-White
Digital Control
DotNL
East West
Eon
Exiter
Farinha
Ferr
Festen
Firmly Underground

Free Inside
Funk Einsatz
Gouryella
Kinky Toys
Lunalife
Moonman
Party Cruiser
Pulp Victim
Pulse
Raya Shaku
Sidewinder
Skywalker
System F
The Nutter
Vimana
Zenithal

Groups and collaborations
This list contains the names of various groups Ferry Corsten has been a member of in collaborations with other artists.

2HD (with Robert Smit)
Alter Native (with Robert Smit)
A.N.Y.  (with Hans van Hemert)
Blade Racer (with Robert Smit)
Block (with Robert Smit)
Boogie Box (with Robert Smit)
Cada (with Robert Smit)
Discodroids (with Peter Nijborn)
Double Dutch (with Robert Smit)
Elektrika (with Robert Smit)
Embrace (with Raz Nitzan)
Energiya (with Robert Smit)
FB (with Benny Benassi)
LoCo (with Joeri Lodders)
Fernick (with Nick Kazemian)
G-Freak (with Robert Smit)
Gouryella (originally with Tiësto, now solely Ferry Corsten)
Mind To Mind (with Piet Bervoets)
New World Punx (with Markus Schulz)
Nixieland (with Piet Bervoets)

Penetrator (with Piet Bervoets)
Project Aurora (with Lucien Foort & Ron Matser)
Riptide (with Piet Bervoets)
Roef (with Robert Smit)
S.O.A (with Robert Smit & René de Ruyter)
Scum (with Robert Smit)
Selected Worx (with Robert Smit)
Sons of Aliens (with Robert Smit)
Soundcheck (with Andre van den Bosch)
Spirit of Adventure (with Robert Smit, John Matze & René de Ruyter)
Starparty (with Robert Smit)
The Hot Wind Blowing (with Jamie Christopherson)
The Tellurians (with Robert Smit, John Matze and René de Ruyter)
Veracocha (with Vincent De Moor)
Vimana (with Tiësto)

References

Discographies of Dutch artists
Electronic music discographies
Production discographies